This is a list of universities in Central African Republic.

Euclid University
Kibogora Polytechnic
University of Bangui
Atlantic African Oriental Multicultural (ATAFOM) University International

References

External links
Universities in Central African Republic

Central African Republic
Universities
Central African Republic